Šlapaberžė (formerly) is a village in Kėdainiai district municipality, in Kaunas County, in central Lithuania. According to the 2011 census, the village has a population of 616 people. The village is located by the Kruostas river, 7 km from Akademija. There is the Catholic church of Christ, a former manor with a park, a wayside chapel.

History
Šlapaberžė was mentioned by the first time in 1371, when it came under the Teutonic Order ride. At the 18th century it was a royal village. 

During the Soviet era Šlapaberžė was a kolkhoz and selsovet center. There was an agriculture school.

Demography

References

Villages in Kaunas County
Kėdainiai District Municipality